Moonlight in Vermont is the title of a 1943 upbeat American musical dramatic film.

Plot
A Vermont farm girl Gwen Harding enrolls in the renowned Devereau dance school in the New York. Her singing makes her semi-popular, and she is soon noticed by fellow student Richard "Slick" Ellis. Ellis' jealous girlfriend Brenda Allenby is soon involved. Farm problems conflict with dance school life and even though her new friends try to help out, other problems, including a vindictive romantic rival, arise.

Cast 

 Gloria Jean as Gwen Harding
 Ray Malone as Richard 'Slick' Ellis
 George Dolenz as Lionel Devereau
 Fay Helm as Lucy Meadows
 Betty McCabe as Joan
 Sidney Miller as Cyril
 Vivian Austin as Brenda Allenby
 Patsy O'Connor as Alice
 Mira McKinney as Elvira
 William 'Billy' Benedict as Abel 
 Virginia Brissac as Aunt Bess
 Russell Simpson as Uncle Rufus

External links

1943 films
American black-and-white films
Universal Pictures films
1940s musical drama films
American musical drama films
1943 drama films
1940s English-language films
Films directed by Edward C. Lilley
1940s American films